Frank Wilkinson (August 16, 1914 – January 2, 2006) was an American civil liberties activist who served as Executive Director of the National Committee Against Repressive Legislation and the First Amendment Foundation (both predecessors to the Defending Dissent Foundation).

Biography 
Born in Charlevoix, Michigan, Frank was one of four children. In 1917, Frank's father, Dr. Alan Wilkinson, enlisted in the Army Medical Corps and was stationed in Arizona. Dr. Wilkinson was a devout Methodist, so much so that Wilkinson recalled, "every morning of my life we had Bible reading and prayers at the breakfast table. It wasn't just saying grace. We got down on our knees and put our heads on the chairs."

In 1925 the family moved to Hollywood, California and on to Beverly Hills two years later. Although they weren't rich, the family was comfortable and Frank told his biographer "I was not touched by the Depression." Wilkinson attended Beverly Hills High School.

Frank graduated from University of California, Los Angeles in 1936,

After graduation, Frank traveled in the U.S., North Africa and the Middle East. His desire to see Hull House, a settlement house founded by Jane Addams, the pacifist anarchist head who won the Nobel Peace Prize in 1931, took him to Chicago. While there, he visited Maxwell Street which he says was "one of the real turning points of my life because I had never seen poverty before." He got another glimpse of poverty when he visited the Bowery in New York City and stayed at a flop house.

He encountered more poverty and degradation in his travels through North Africa and the Middle East. His experiences there caused him to re-evaluate his faith. He wrote to his friend, U.C. Berkeley President Robert Gordon Sproul: "Dear Bob, There is no God..." But his commitment to humanity and to building a better world was still there, he just had a new perspective on it.

FBI file 
When he came home, he informed his family of his new-found atheism and zeal for social reform. The FBI was so interested in his transformation, they opened up a file on him. The first entry notes that he had been seen in the company of "known Communists." The FBI continued to monitor Wilkinson's activities for the next four decades.

By chance, Wilkinson met Msgr. Thomas O'Dwyer, the Archdiocesan Director of Catholic Charities, who introduced him to slums a few scant miles from his home in Beverly Hills, and recruited him to the Citizens Housing Council, and advocacy group for slum clearance and public housing. From this, it was a logical progression to the staff of the Los Angeles Housing Authority.

At the Housing Authority, Frank campaigned for the integration of the first Watts Housing project, he was appointed manager and given the job of implementing the integration he had demanded. As the housing program expanded into a massive $110,000,000 plan for the area, he became the Special Assistant to the Executive Director. Among his new responsibilities was the task of explaining slum clearance and public housing to the general public. This put him in contact with a multitude of groups, ranging from veterans' organizations and Catholic, Jewish and Protestant hierarchies to the many diverse community and political groups, including the Communist Party.

Chavez Ravine 
Wilkinson was caught up in the McCarthy Era when he defended a major public housing project, Elysian Park Heights, for the Chávez Ravine section of Los Angeles. Many residents of this area had already been displaced due to the impending construction of a new public housing project to be designed by Richard Neutra.

In August, 1952, Frank was assigned by the Housing Authority of the City of Los Angeles to testify as an expert witness in the condemnation proceedings against a group of property owners in the Chavez Ravine, then a predominantly Hispanic and impoverished community. Frank and the housing authority wanted to turn the area into integrated public housing. Frank testified at length on the slum-like conditions in the ravine. Felix McGinnis, a lawyer for the landlords, began his cross examination. He had an FBI dossier on Frank Wilkinson and other Housing Authority employees that had been given to him by LA Police Chief William Parker. He asked: "Mr. Wilkinson, will you now tell us of all the organizations, political or otherwise, with which you have associated?" Frank divulged a long list of the groups he had joined: religious, civic, his fraternity. When he stopped, he was asked if that was all. He refused to go on, as a "matter of personal conscience. And if necessary I would hold that to answer such a question might in some way incriminate me."  

The court ruled him disqualified as an expert; his testimony was stricken from the record. The Los Angeles City Council passed a resolution deploring his refusal to answer and calling upon the House Un-American Activities Committee to come to L.A. to investigate the Housing Authority.

The California Senate's "little HUAC" (California Senate Factfinding Subcommittee on Un-American Activities) subpoenaed both Frank and his wife, Jean, a high school social studies teacher, for a closed session. By now it was clear the only purpose was the probe of the political associations of persons related to the Housing Authority. As a matter of personal conscience and social responsibility, Frank and Jean refused to answer. They were both fired immediately. As the investigation of the Housing Authority continued, the program collapsed and Chavez Ravine became Dodger Stadium.

Campaign Against the House Un-American Activities 

Wilkinson was called before the House Un-American Activities Committee (HUAC) twice, once in 1956 in Los Angeles, and again in 1958 in Atlanta. Both times he chose to plead the First Amendment (rather than the Fifth). In Atlanta he was joined in pleading the First by Carl Braden, a civil rights activist. They both were cited for contempt of Congress in a vote of 435-0 for Frank and 434-1 for Carl. Their case went all the way up to the Supreme Court (see Wilkinson v. United States). In a 5–4 decision, the court upheld Wilkinson's conviction (they refused to hear Braden's case, so the effect was to uphold his conviction as well).

While the case was wending its way through the courts, Wilkinson toured the country speaking out against HUAC and organizing in cities where HUAC held hearings. In 1960, he helped form the National Committee to Abolish HUAC, which evolved into the National Committee Against Repressive Legislation, the organization he led until his death.

On May 1, 1961, Frank and Carl Braden entered federal prison.

132,000 Pages in his FBI File 
After his release, Wilkinson continued his work to Abolish the House Un-American Activities Committee, traveling the country, speaking at campuses and meetings to build opposition to HUAC. During this time he continued to be closely monitored by the FBI.

In 1986, with the help of attorneys from the American Civil Liberties Union, Wilkinson sued for his FBI file. Eventually the FBI was forced to release 132,000 pages of files which included Wilkinson's reports on his speaking engagements and travel, as well as an apparent plot to assassinate him.

Awards 
Because of his resistance to political repression, Wilkinson received the Roger Baldwin Medal of Liberty; and the American Civil Liberties Union Eason Monroe Courageous Advocate Award, the Earl Warren Civil Liberties Award, and the 1997 National Lawyers’ Guild Legal Worker of the Year.

Wilkinson's story was featured in a special edition of Life (magazine) in 1991, celebrating the bicentennial of the Bill of Rights. (unavailable online)

Films and music 
Wilkinson is featured in several films:

The HUAC- produced propaganda film Operation Abolition, Wilkinson is interviewed starting at minute 38.

The Un-Americans, BBC documentary

The Price of Freedom, narrated by Ed Asner

and in Ry Cooder's song Don't Call me Red

References

Sources
 Frank Wilkinson, "Revisiting the 'Mccarthy Era': Looking at Wilkinson v. United States in Light of Wilkinson v. Federal Bureau of Investigation", Loyola Law School, Los Angeles, Law Review, v. 32, n.2.
PBS: Chavez Ravine.  
"Frank Wilkinson's Legacy", The Nation

External links
 1936 Yearbook Photo
 National Committee Against Repressive Legislation NCARL
 NCARL and the First Amendment Foundation merged to become Defending Dissent Foundation (www.defenddissent.org).

Further reading 
 Robert Sherrill (2005), First Amendment Felon: The Story of Frank Wilkinson, His 132,000-Page FBI File, and His Epic Fight for Civil Rights and Liberties. Nation  Books. , .

1914 births
2006 deaths
American civil rights activists
American democracy activists
University of California, Los Angeles alumni
Beverly Hills High School alumni